The 1999 season of the Liga de Fútbol Profesional Boliviano was the 42nd season of top-tier football in Bolivia.

Torneo Apertura

Torneo Clausura

Group A

Group B

Final

Championship play-off

Promotion/relegation play-off 

San José (Oruro) relegated; Atlético Pompeya and Mariscal Braun promoted

Title

Topscorers

Notes

See also 
 Bolivia national football team 1999

References 
 RSSSF Page

Bolivian Primera División seasons
Bolivia
1999 in Bolivian football